Chittenden may refer to:

Places 
Chittenden County, Vermont
Chittenden, Vermont, a New England town in Rutland County
Chittenden (CDP), Vermont, a village in the town
Chittenden, California, in Santa Cruz County
Chittenden Hotel, a former hotel in Ohio
Chittenden Lake, a lake in California
Chittenden Peak, a mountain in California
Mount Chittenden, a mountain in Wyoming

People 
 Frank Hurlbut Chittenden (1858–1929), American entomologist
 Hiram M. Chittenden (1858–1917), Seattle District Engineer for the Army Corps of Engineers
 Kate Sara Chittenden (1856–1949), American classical pianist, head of piano at Vassar College, founding dean of the American Institute of Applied Music
 Khan Chittenden (born 1983), New Zealand-born Australian actor
 Lucius E. Chittenden (1824–1900), Vermont author, banker, lawyer, politician and peace advocate
 Martin Chittenden (1763–1840), member of U.S. House of Representatives (1803–1813), and Governor of Vermont (1813–1815)
 Russell Henry Chittenden (1856–1943), biochemist at Yale University
 Simeon B. Chittenden (1814–1889), United States Representative from New York
 Thomas Chittenden (1730–1797), first Governor of Vermont (1778–1789, 1790–1797)